"The One in Barbados" is a double length episode of Friends, the final episode of the ninth season. It first aired on the NBC network in the United States on May 15, 2003.

The first part marks the final appearance of David (Hank Azaria).

Plot

Part I
Ross is selected to deliver a keynote speech at a paleontology convention in Barbados, and invites the gang to accompany him. Phoebe can't stop thinking about her ex Mike, while going out with David. Rachel has feelings for Joey but doesn't know how to tell him. Monica and Chandler try to prevent David from proposing marriage to Phoebe.

Part II
Joey and Charlie see they have nothing in common and decide to break up. Charlie tells Ross that she also broke up with Joey because she had feelings for "someone else" and then they kiss. Joey, after seeing this, goes to kiss Rachel.
Meanwhile, Chandler and Phoebe are bored watching Monica and Mike play an extremely long game of ping-pong. After Monica hurts her wrist, Chandler takes over for her and wins the game.

Reception
In the original broadcast, the episode was viewed by 25.46 million viewers. Sam Ashurst from Digital Spy ranked the first part No. 71 and the second part No. 79 on their ranking of the 236 Friends episodes. Telegraph & Argus had the same rankings on their ranking of all 236 Friends episodes.

References

2003 American television episodes
Friends (season 9) episodes